Trinity Chapel is a chapel within Canterbury Cathedral.

Trinity Chapel may also refer to:

England
 Trinity Independent Chapel, an independent chapel in Poplar, East London

United States
 Trinity Chapel-Episcopal, Ottawa, MN, listed on the NRHP in Le Sueur County, Minnesota
 Trinity Chapel (Far Rockaway, New York), listed on the NRHP in New York
 Trinity Chapel, New York University
 Trinity Chapel Complex, New York, NY, listed on the NRHP in New York
 Reinholds Station Trinity Chapel, Reinholds, PA, listed on the NRHP in Pennsylvania

See also
 Trinity College Chapel (disambiguation)